Saint-Pierre-de-Soucy is a commune in the Savoie department in the Auvergne-Rhône-Alpes region in south-eastern France.

Geography

Climate

Saint-Pierre-de-Soucy has a oceanic climate (Köppen climate classification Cfb) closely bordering on a humid subtropical climate (Cfa).

See also
Communes of the Savoie department

References

Saintpierredesoucy